"Good Boy" is a song recorded by South Korean duo GD X Taeyang, members of the boy band Big Bang. It was released on November 21, 2014, as the second hip-hop project from YG Entertainment, the first being "Niliria" by G-Dragon featuring Missy Elliott a year prior. The single was written by G-Dragon, who also produced it along with the Fliptones and Freedo. "Good Boy" became a chart-topper on Billboards World Digital Songs and a Top 5 hit on the Gaon Digital Chart. Additionally, a physical single was released and topped the Gaon Albums Chart.

Release and promotion
YG Entertainment announced a new hip hop project on November 17 by G-Dragon collaborating with another artist. The following day, Taeyang was revealed to be a part of the project. A teaser trailer was released on November 20 announcing that the single would be named "Good Boy" and was set to be released on November 21. The track topped South Korean online music services and iTunes charts in seven countries upon its release.

A music video directed by Colin Tilley was released to promote the single. As of April 2016, "Good Boy" surpassed 100 million views on YouTube, making BigBang the first Korean boy group to have three music videos pass this mark. The video went on to be featured as a YouTube Music Moment for the 2015 YouTube Music Awards.

A dance practice video was also released, showing the dance choreography by Parris Goebel.

Critical reception
"Good Boy" received generally favorable reviews. The song was dubbed an "amazing club song" by Fuse, who also called it one of the best 10 songs of November 2014, writing that it"[i]s a huge EDM/hip hop banger that feels like the next 'Turn Down for What'". It also ranked as one of Fuse's "41 Best Songs of 2014" at No. 15.

Billboard gave a positive review, stating, "[G-Dragon & Taeyang are] at the top of the vocal, rap and dance game in one of the year's most epic club tracks", and listed the single at number three in their "Best K-Pop Songs of 2014" list, feeling that the duo "hardly feels like a collaboration, but more like a cohesive artist."

Justin Block from Complex felt that "Good Boy" will "instantly have your face all the scrunched up when the drop hits", making it "quite impossible to not feel yourself to G-Dragon and Taeyang" on the song.

Accolades

Track listing and formats
 Digital download
"Good Boy"  – 4:05

 CD single
 "Good Boy" – 4:05
 "Good Boy" (a cappella) – 4:05
 "Good Boy" (Instrumental) – 4:05
 "Good Boy" (MR) – 4:05

Commercial performance
"Good Boy" debuted at number five on South Korea's Gaon Digital Chart, with 169,139 downloads. The physical edition, released a month latter, topped the Gaon Album Chart upon release.

The song peaked at number one on Billboards World Digital Songs chart, marking the third time a Korean act had topped the chart after PSY and 2NE1.

Charts and sales

Weekly charts

Year-end charts

Sales

References

2014 singles
2014 songs
Korean-language songs
G-Dragon songs
Hip hop songs
Taeyang songs
YG Entertainment singles
Songs written by G-Dragon
Song recordings produced by the Fliptones
Music videos directed by Colin Tilley